The fifteenth season of British science fiction television series Doctor Who began on 3 September 1977 with the episode Horror of Fang Rock, and ended with The Invasion of Time. The fourth series for the Fourth Doctor, new producer Graham Williams became producer for this series (and the two following), while Robert Holmes left script editing for Anthony Read midway through.

Casting

Main cast 
 Tom Baker as the Fourth Doctor
 Louise Jameson as Leela
 John Leeson as Voice of K9

Tom Baker and Louise Jameson continue their roles as the Fourth Doctor and Leela. K9, played by John Leeson, makes his first appearance during the second serial The Invisible Enemy. Louise Jameson makes her final appearance as Leela in The Invasion of Time.

Serials

Graham Williams took over as producer from Philip Hinchcliffe. Robert Holmes was replaced as script editor by Anthony Read, during The Sun Makers.  The season took a short transmission break of two weeks over the Christmas 1977 period, between the broadcasts of The Sun Makers and Underworld.

Production
Season fifteen proved to be a difficult transition period. Philip Hinchcliffe's departure coincided with the loss of a number of long-time contributors to the show as Graham Williams took over as Producer. Williams remarked, "I had to try and find some new ones, and that wasn't the least of the problems. Bob Holmes was stuck on Weng-Chiang for ages... all the scripts were coming in late...".

Robert Holmes remained to work on the three stories he had commissioned, while his successor, Anthony Read, trailed him in preparation of taking over the position. Read, an experienced director and producer, had only agreed to the position of Script Editor because he was intrigued by the chance to work on Doctor Who. Holmes completed Horror of Fang Rock and The Invisible Enemy, before leaving due to creative exhaustion. Image of the Fendahl fell to Read, who had to hastily write K-9 into the story when Holmes made him a regular character. 

While Tom Baker enjoyed working with John Leeson (the voice of K-9) in rehearsals, he disliked the prop. Holmes recalled, "it used to drive Tom spare, and more often than not, he'd kick it out of frustration." Holmes agreed to write The Sun Makers, and while the story was meant to follow K-9's introduction and establish him as a regular character, scheduling problems--resulting in the shelving of scripts that Fang Rock had to replace--required the story order to change, with Fendahl preceding it.

Baker had found it difficult to accept the violent Leela character since her introduction, contributing to growing tensions between himself and Louise Jameson. According to Jameson, the tension came to a head during the recording of Fang Rock, when she finally confronted Baker over multiple takes of a scene caused by him entering early and cutting her off. Tensions between the two eased over the course of the season.

Read commissioned Bob Baker and Dave Martin to write Underworld, the penultimate story of the season. Right away, the production was hit hard by record inflation, resulting in the design staff working day and night and inventing new techniques and processes to complete the story on time. The final story, The Invasion of Time, proved even more chaotic: with a reduced budget, a complete last-minute re-write by Read and Williams, and a BBC industrial-dispute between the props department and the electricians.

Broadcast
The entire season was broadcast from 3 September 1977 to 11 March 1978.

Home media

VHS releases

DVD and Blu-ray releases

In print

References

Bibliography

 

1977 British television seasons
1978 British television seasons
Season 15
Season 15
15